A Song for Jenny is a 2015 British television film directed by Brian Percival and starring Emily Watson as Julie Nicholson, whose daughter Jenny was murdered in the 7 July 2005 London bombings.  It is based on Nicholson's book of the same name.

Cast
Emily Watson as Julie Nicholson
Nicola Wren as Jenny
Steven Mackintosh as Greg
Martha Mackintosh as Lizzie
Laurence Belcher as Thomas
Alan Rothwell as Uncle Jimmie
Gwilym Lee as James
Anne Stallybrass as Mother
John Woodvine as Father
Sophie Dix as Sharon
Noah Jupe as William
Poppy Miller as Vanda
Stuart Martin as Colin
Maxine Evans as Pauline
Bruce Byron as Taxi Driver
Andrew Whipp as DCI

References

External links
 
 

July 2005 London bombings
British films based on actual events
Films set in the 21st century
2015 television films
2015 films
BBC One
British television films
Films set in 2005
Films set in London
Films based on non-fiction books
Films directed by Brian Percival
2010s English-language films